The United Nations Educational, Scientific and Cultural Organization (UNESCO) World Heritage Sites are places of importance to cultural or natural heritage as described in the UNESCO World Heritage Convention, established in 1972. Turkey accepted the convention on 16 March 1983, making its historical sites eligible for inclusion on the list. As of 2021, there are nineteen World Heritage Sites in Turkey, including seventeen cultural sites and two mixed sites.

The first three sites in Turkey, Great Mosque and Hospital of Divriği, Historic Areas of Istanbul and Göreme National Park and the Rock Sites of Cappadocia, were inscribed on the list at the 9th Session of the World Heritage Committee, held in Paris, France in 1985. The latest inscriptions, Aphrodisias, was added to the list in 2017, Göbekli Tepe in 2018 and Arslantepe in 2021.

World Heritage Sites

Site; named after the World Heritage Committee's official designation
Location; at city, regional, or provincial level and geocoordinates
Criteria; as defined by the World Heritage Committee
Area; in hectares and acres. If available, the size of the buffer zone has been noted as well. A value of zero implies that no data has been published by UNESCO
Year; during which the site was inscribed to the World Heritage List
Description; brief information about the site, including reasons for qualifying as an endangered site, if applicable

See also
List of World Heritage Sites in Turkey (tentative list)
List of ancient settlements in Turkey

References

 
World Heritage Sites
World Heritage Sites
Turkey
World Heritage Sites